The Banff and Buchan by-election to the Scottish Parliament was held on 7 June 2001, the same day as a UK general election and also a Scottish Parliament by-election in Strathkelvin and Bearsden. The by-election was caused by the resignation of Scottish National Party (SNP) politician Alex Salmond as MSP for Banff and Buchan.

The SNP retained the Holyrood seat with Stewart Stevenson (who had originally been selected to contest the Westminster constituency) winning for them.

Result

Scottish Parliament Election result, 1999

See also
Elections in Scotland
List of by-elections to the Scottish Parliament

2001 elections in the United Kingdom
2001 in Scotland
2001 Banff
By-elections to the Scottish Parliament
Politics of Aberdeenshire
21st century in Aberdeenshire
June 2001 events in the United Kingdom